Morten Rokkedal Kristensen (born 10 October 1997) is a Danish footballer, who plays for amateur club Løgstør IF.

Club career

AaB
On 29 May 2016, Rokkedal got his professional and Superliga debut for AaB, in a match against OB. He was in the line up and played the whole match.

On 10 June 2016 it was announced, that Rokkedal was promoted to the senior squad. He left the club at the end of his contract, which expired on 31 December 2017.

Loan to Thisted FC
Rokkedal didn't play a single game for AaB in the 2016/17 season, and was loaned out in the summer 2017 for the upcoming season.

Løgstør IF
After leaving AaB, Rokkedal joined his childhood-club Løgstør IF. Rokkedal was named Player of the Year at Løgstør in 2019.

References

External links
 Morten Rokkedal on Soccerway
 Morten Rokkedal on DBU

1997 births
Living people
Danish men's footballers
Danish Superliga players
AaB Fodbold players
Denmark youth international footballers
Association football defenders
Place of birth missing (living people)